Franck Engonga (born 26 July 1993) is a Gabonese professional footballer who currently plays for Tala'ea El Gaish and the Gabon national football team. He has competed at the 2012 Summer Olympics.

Career

Boca Juniors
Engonga signed with the Argentine giants Boca Juniors in October 2012.

Club Africain
In August 2013, it was announced that Engonga has signed a three-year contract with the Tunisian side Club Africain, but he returned to his team CF Mounana.

References

External links

 

1993 births
Living people
Gabonese footballers
Olympic footballers of Gabon
Footballers at the 2012 Summer Olympics
2013 African U-20 Championship players
Boca Juniors footballers
Association football midfielders
Gabon international footballers
Gabon youth international footballers
21st-century Gabonese people